Cold shock domain-containing protein C2 is a protein that in humans is encoded by the CSDC2 gene.

References

External links

Further reading